The Vultures is a Canadian drama film, directed by Jean-Claude Labrecque and released in 1975. Set in 1958 near the end of the Maurice Duplessis era in Quebec politics, the film centres on Louis Pelletier (Gilbert Sicotte), a young man whose mother has just died, and who is coping with a trio of aunts who are much more interested in what they stand to inherit from their sister's estate than in supporting their nephew.

Labrecque released a sequel film, The Years of Dreams and Revolt (Les Années de rêves), in 1984.

Cast 
 Gilbert Sicotte : Louis Pelletier
 Jean Duceppe : Maurice Duplessis, Premier Ministre du Québec
 Monique Mercure : Tante Yvette Laflamme
 Carmen Tremblay : Tante Marie Roberge
 Amulette Garneau : Tante Adèle McKenzie
 Jean Mathieu : Oncle John McKenzie
 Denise Proulx : Sœur Ste-Germaine
 Paule Baillargeon : Sœur Ste-Gabrielle
 Roger Lebel : Armand Bouchard, député de Limoilou
 Anne-Marie Provencher : Claudette, la jeune voisine
 Rita Lafontaine : Madame Sansfaçon, une voisine
 Raymond Cloutier : Monsieur Sansfaçon, un voisin
 Nicole Leblanc : Une voisine
 Robert Gravel : Jeune séminariste, ancien ami de Louis
 Guy L'Écuyer : Joseph Bériault, le croque-mort
 Gabriel Arcand : Assistant du croque-mort
 Gilles Pelletier : Docteur Loiselle
 Philippe Robert : Le curé
 Georges Groulx : Le notaire
 Yolande Roy : Alda Pelletier, la mère de Louis
 Jacques Bilodeau : Rôle inconnu

References

External links

1975 films
Films directed by Jean-Claude Labrecque
Canadian drama films
Films set in Quebec
Films shot in Quebec
1970s French-language films
French-language Canadian films
1970s Canadian films